Qazi Muhammad Muhiuddin was an Indian politician from Uttarakhand and Six term Member of the Uttar Pradesh Legislative Assembly from Laksar and Roorkee assembly constituency. He was a member of the various political parties from time to time. He served as Minister in Ram Naresh Yadav, Banarasi Das, Kalyan Singh and Mayawati Cabinet.

Positions held

References

1943 births
Members of the Uttarakhand Legislative Assembly
Uttar Pradesh MLAs 1974–1977
Uttar Pradesh MLAs 1977–1980
Uttar Pradesh MLAs 1980–1985
Uttar Pradesh MLAs 1985–1989
Uttar Pradesh MLAs 1989–1991
Uttar Pradesh MLAs 1997–2002
People from Haridwar district
Living people
Janata Party politicians
Bharatiya Lok Dal politicians
Janata Party (Secular) politicians
Lok Dal politicians
Indian National Congress politicians from Uttarakhand
Bahujan Samaj Party politicians
Indian National Congress politicians from Uttar Pradesh